20 Hits Special Collection, Vol. 1 is a greatest hits album by American country music singer and songwriter Hank Williams, Jr. This album was released on November 7, 1995, on the Curb Records label.

Track listing

External links
 Hank Williams, Jr's Official Website
 Record Label

1995 greatest hits albums
Albums produced by Jimmy Bowen
Hank Williams Jr. compilation albums
Curb Records compilation albums